Samuel Hart Wright (1825–1905) was a farmer, astronomer, botanist, teacher, and almanac editor. He accumulated and maintained a large collection of plants. He catalogued Hartwrightia and it is named for him. He served as an editor of the Farmers' Almanac.

Wright was from Peekskill, New York and later lived in Jerusalem, New York. He taught at Dundee Academy.

He helped produce The Illustrated Family Christian Almanac for the United States in 1867.

He corresponded with John Torrey in 1870.

Wright published a regular column including a mathematics problem.

Malacologist Berlin Hart Wright (1851–1940) was his son.

Charles Willison Johnson wrote about him in 1906 in The Nautilus.

References

External links

1825 births
1905 deaths
Almanac compilers
Scientists from New York (state)
People from Jerusalem, New York
People from Peekskill, New York
19th-century American botanists
19th-century American astronomers
Farmers from New York (state)